New Americans can refer to:

 New Americans (film), a 1944 documentary film
 The New Americans, a 2004 seven-hour American documentary
 a generic term for immigrants to the United States